Fred Hole (8 May 1935 – 4 February 2011) was an English art director. He was nominated for an Academy Award in the category Best Art Direction for the film Return of the Jedi.

Selected filmography
 Return of the Jedi (1983)

References

External links

1935 births
2011 deaths
Welsh art directors
Mass media people from Cardiff